Cory Miller (born July 22, 1988) is an American soccer player.

Career

College and Amateur
Miller was an all-conference centerback at Olivet Nazarene University in Bourbonnais, Illinois from 2006 to 2009. During his senior season in 2009, he led ONU to the Chicagoland Collegiate Athletic Conference championship and the NAIA national tournament – both program firsts. He was two-time NAIA Scholar-Athlete and CCAC All-First Team and CCAC All-Academic Team in 2009.
 
During his college years he also played with the Atlanta Blackhawks and the DFW Tornados in the USL Premier Development League.

Professional
Miller was invited to try out with the Portland Timbers prior to their inaugural season in Major League Soccer in 2011, but was not offered a contract by the team.

Miller signed his first professional contract in 2011 when he joined Carolina RailHawks of the North American Soccer League. He made his professional debut on April 9 in a game against Puerto Rico Islanders. On August 28, 2014, Miller was signed by Indy Eleven of the North American Soccer League.

For the 2018 season he was on the roster at Detroit City FC.

References

External links
 Carolina RailHawks bio
 Indy Eleven Bio

1988 births
Living people
People from Snellville, Georgia
Sportspeople from the Atlanta metropolitan area
Soccer players from Georgia (U.S. state)
Soccer players from Chicago
American soccer players
Association football defenders
Atlanta Blackhawks players
DFW Tornados players
North Carolina FC players
Orange County SC players
Indy Eleven players
USL League Two players
North American Soccer League players
USL Championship players